Otto of Bavaria may refer to:

 Otto I, Duke of Swabia and Bavaria (955–982)
 Otto of Nordheim (c. 1020–1083)
 Otto I Wittelsbach, Duke of Bavaria (1117–1183)
 Otto VIII, Count Palatine of Bavaria (before 1180 – 7 March 1209)
 Otto II Wittelsbach, Duke of Bavaria (1206–1253)
 Otto III, Duke of Bavaria (1261–1312)
 Otto IV, Duke of Lower Bavaria (1307–1334)
 Otto V, Duke of Bavaria (1346–1379)
 Otto Henry, Count Palatine of Sulzbach (1556–1604)
 Otto Henry, Elector Palatine (1502–1559)
 Otto I, Count Palatine of Mosbach (1390–1461)
 Otto II, Count Palatine of Mosbach-Neumarkt (1435–1499)
 Charles II Otto, Count Palatine of Zweibrücken-Birkenfeld (1625–1671)
 Otto of Greece (1815–1867)
 Otto, King of Bavaria (1848–1916)